Helen Blake (born 1 May 1951) is a Jamaican sprinter. She competed in the women's 400 metres at the 1976 Summer Olympics. Blake finished fourth in the 400 metres at the 1975 Pan American Games and sixth in the 400 metres at the 1979 Pan American Games.

References

External links
 

1951 births
Living people
Athletes (track and field) at the 1976 Summer Olympics
Jamaican female sprinters
Olympic athletes of Jamaica
Athletes (track and field) at the 1975 Pan American Games
Athletes (track and field) at the 1979 Pan American Games
Pan American Games competitors for Jamaica
Athletes (track and field) at the 1978 Commonwealth Games
Commonwealth Games competitors for Jamaica
Competitors at the 1978 Central American and Caribbean Games
Central American and Caribbean Games silver medalists for Jamaica
Central American and Caribbean Games bronze medalists for Jamaica
Place of birth missing (living people)
Central American and Caribbean Games medalists in athletics
Olympic female sprinters
20th-century Jamaican women